Dan & Becs was an Irish comedy television series aired on RTÉ Two. It portrayed the lives of an affluent South Dublin couple. Dan was played by Dave Coffey and Becs was played by Holly White. In 2008 the show was nominated for an IFTA in the Best Television Entertainment Category.

The show ended in 2007 after two series. Both series were released in December 2007 on one DVD with added extras. Creator Dave Coffey, who also played Dan in the show, is working on a new show, Sarah & Steve which he described as a "sweet romantic comedy about a relationship between two working class people based in Tallaght".

Premise 
The comedy focused on the lives of Dan, an unemployed aspiring filmmaker and Becs, an aspiring actress and model. The two were a couple from Dalkey and discussed their lives six months into their relationship.

The show did not follow the typical format of a sitcom.  Each episode was ten minutes long and the two characters were never in the same room with each other (with the exception of both season finales), instead intercutting the individual video diaries of the couple. Dan was usually found in his bedroom in the home of his adopted parents where he still lived. Most episodes followed Becs driving around after an audition for a modelling or acting job. The only times the two ever appeared in the same shot was in the two series finales.

Episodes

References

External links
 Official Dan and Becs site
 Irish Times interview (subscription required)
 

2000s Irish television series
Fictional couples
Irish comedy duos
Irish comedy television shows
RTÉ original programming